Sick is the second     studio album by American rock band Loaded. It is their first album since reforming after they went on hiatus in 2002. It was recorded and produced by Martin Feveyear at Jupiter Studios in Seattle, Washington, and was released on March 30, 2009, in Europe and April 7 in the US, through Century Media Records. Writing for the album began in 2008 when vocalist Scott Weiland departed Duff McKagan's other band, Velvet Revolver, in April of the same year. Recording for the follow-up to their 2001 debut album Dark Days began and was completed in June 2008.

Following the release of the album, Loaded went on to promote it for over half a year; releasing one single, "Flatline", and touring in several regions, including the United States, South America and several countries in Europe as well as playing at several music festivals. The album received generally positive reviews, many of which made some comparisons to McKagan's then-former band, Guns N' Roses.

Background and production
When singer and guitarist Duff McKagan began working on a new project with his former Guns N' Roses bandmates Slash and Matt Sorum in 2002, he effectively put Loaded on hiatus the same year. Adding former Loaded guitarist Dave Kushner and Stone Temple Pilots singer Scott Weiland to the lineup, they formed the hard rock supergroup Velvet Revolver in 2003. They released their debut album, Contraband, in 2004 and the follow-up, Libertad, in 2007. Loaded reunited in 2006 to perform a benefit show for Jerry Allen's Cancer Fund and continued to play shows on occasion. Knowing that Velvet Revolver's tour was ending, McKagan announced that Loaded were working on a new album.

Loaded rented a rehearsal space and wrote new material including "Mothers Day," "I See Through You," "Sleaze Factory," "Flatline," and worked on older material such as "Sick," wrote in 2002, and "Wasted Heart," wrote in 2006–07. They began recording the album on June 4, 2008 with producer Martin Feveyear at Jupiter Studios in Seattle, Washington. The album was primarily recorded by the band, with Norman Baltzo, Greg Schroeder and Nate Schlermer providing horns on the song "Blind Date Girl," and was completed in less than two weeks, costing only $20,000. Loaded subsequently signed a deal with independent record label Century Media

Promotion

On June 24, 2008, Loaded made Dark Days available for free download, from select websites, to help promote the band. They began touring prior to the release of the album, touring the UK, Europe and Japan. They released an EP entitled Wasted Heart, featuring four songs from Sick as well as a bonus song, on September 22, 2008, to coincide with their European Tour. The band filmed and released a promotional music video for the song "No More" for the EP release. They also performed at the Italian music festival Rock of Ages, the Azkena Festival in Spain and the Loud Park Festival in Japan.

From June 2008 the band released several promotional webisodes, five on the making of "Sick" and one of the 2008 U.K. tour.

Following the release of Sick, Loaded toured the United States, South America, and Europe. They released one single, "Flatline," though it failed to chart. In June 2009, the performed at Download Festival in the UK Rock am Ring and Rock im Park in Germany, Rockfest in the United States, and the Sauna Open Air Festival in Finland. They joined Mötley Crüe on their tour of Europe, as their support band, before joining Black Stone Cherry on their tour of Europe and the UK.

Release
Sick was released in Europe on March 20 and in the United States on April 7, 2009. It entered the U.S. Billboard Top Heetseakers charts at #43 in its first week, selling over 1,400 copies.

The iTunes Store edition of Sick included two bonus tracks: non-album track "Roll Away" and an instrumental version of the single "Flatline."

A Limited Deluxe Edition of Sick was released the same day as the standard Europe release. It included a bonus DVD of 2008 Loaded's show at The Garage in Glasgow, Scotland, a promotional music video of "No More" and the five of the band's Webisodes, with the addition of the UK Tour Webisode. This edition of the album was re-released on 20 May 2011, following the band's signing to Eagle Rock Entertainment. This edition also featured a new album cover, which was previously used only on limited edition LP versions of the album The iTunes edition was also updated.

Reception

Sick was met with generally positive critical reviews. Most reviewers noted punk influences on the album and offered some comparison to that of McKagan's former band Guns N' Roses. Tim Grierson of About.com said that the band "will appeal to those who wished GNR had just kept making albums like Appetite for Destruction until the day they died" noting "[t]he emphasis is on brawling guitar riffs and three-minute songs" but "occasionally McKagan slows down the tempo for bluesy ballads." Stephen Thomas Erlewine of Allmusic stated that the album "doesn't necessarily rock with abandon" that "it's a bit too precise, a bit too clean for that" but "it does have a kick and spirit, enough energy to power through the somewhat pedestrian songwriting." Amy Sciarretto, reviewing the album for both Artistdirect and Ultimate Guitar Archive, compared McKagan's and Guns N' Roses singer Axl Rose vocals, noting a similarity between the two while stating the songs "Sick" and "Sleaze Factory" "blend Los Angeles glitz, Sunset glam and grunge, Seattle-inspired guitars" and  "are kicked up by the punk rock intensity." Steve Morse of The Boston Globe notes Iggy Pop, Ramones and Lou Reed influences on the album, stating the "highlights are the riff-laced love songs with a domestic edge." Chris Beaumont of Blogcritics said that Loaded "come together as a solid unit, delivering the goods" on the album. He continued, stating that the songs "may not be the greatest, but there is an inviting quality about them that encourages listeners to just rock along for the ride" and noted that they "giv[ed] off a feeling of experience grounded by youthful energy."

Track listing

Personnel
All information is excerpted from the album's stated information.

Loaded
 Duff McKagan - lead vocals, rhythm guitar, bass guitar on "Mother's Day"
 Geoff Reading - drums, backing vocals
 Jeff Rouse - bass guitar, backing vocals, lead vocals on "Translucent"
 Mike Squires - lead guitar, backing vocals

Additional personnel
 Norman Baltzo  -  horns on "Blind Date Girl"
 Greg Schroeder  -  horns on "Blind Date Girl"
 Nate Schlermer  -  horns on "Blind Date Girl"

Bonus DVD credits
 Dave Meehan  -  director
 Martin Feveyear  -  concert audio mixing, mastering
 Julie Briscoe  -  DVD authoring
 Paul Hurt  -  location audio
 David Ellison  -  camera
 Chris Moorcraft  -  camera
 Jake Meehan  -  camera
 Scott Johnson  -  camera
 Viv Quick  -  camera

Production
 Martin Feveyear  -  production, engineering, mixing, mastering, additional percussion
 Jon Ervie  -  assistance
 Stewart Shank  -  assistance
 William Brown  -  assistance
 Steve Joh  -  A&R
 Rick Canny  -  management
 Brian H. McPherson Esq.  -  legal
 Jenna Adler  -  US booking agent
 Ian Sales  -  Europe/UK booking agent
 Beth Sabbagh  -  accounting
 Christel Layton  -  accounting
 Terri Beverford  -  accounting
 Craig Howell  -  art design, layout
 Lance Mercer  -  photography

Release history

Charts

References

2009 albums
Loaded (band) albums
Albums produced by Martin Feveyear